Underground Soul! is the debut album by saxophonist Houston Person which was recorded in 1966 and released on the Prestige label.

Reception

Allmusic awarded the album 2 stars.

Track listing 
All compositions by Houston Person except as noted
 "What The World Needs Now Is Love" (Hal David, Burt Bacharach) - 3:55   
 "Underground Soul" - 5:45   
 "The Pimp" - 3:45   
 "Tears" (Mark Levine) - 3:45   
 "Aleilula" (Edu Lobo, Roy Guerra) - 4:10   
 "Ballin'" (Danny Wright) - 5:50   
 "If You Could See Me Now" (Tadd Dameron, Carl Sigman) - 4:25   
 "Strike Up the Band" (George Gershwin, Ira Gershwin) - 3:00

Personnel 
Houston Person - tenor saxophone
Mark Levine - trombone
Charles Boston - organ
Frank Jones - drums

References 

Houston Person albums
1966 debut albums
Prestige Records albums
Albums recorded at Van Gelder Studio
Albums produced by Cal Lampley